Hnilec may refer to:

 Hnilec (village), Slovakia
 Hnilec (river), Slovakia

eo:Hnilec